Anahita is a feminine given name named after the ancient Iranian goddess Anahita, associated with fertility, healing and wisdom. The name has increased in usage in recent years along with other mythological names. People named Anahita include:
Anahita Dargahi (born 1987), Iranian actress
Anahita Hemmati (born 1973), Iranian actress
Anahita Khalatbari, American journalist
Anahita Nemati (born 1977), Iranian actress and model
Anahita Uberoi (born 1967), Indian actress
Anahita Ratebzad (1931–2014), Afghan socialist
Anahita Zahedifar (born 2003), Iranian chess player

See also
Anaita Shroff Adajania (born 1972), Indian fashion designer
Anahit (name)

Notes

Persian feminine given names